John Hearne may be:

J. T. Hearne (1867–1944), British cricket bowler
J. W. Hearne (1891–1965), British cricket all-rounder
John Hearne (lawyer) (1893–1969), Irish legal scholar and diplomat 
John Edgar Colwell Hearne (1926–1994), Canadian-born Jamaican writer and educator
John Hearne (composer) (fl. late 20th century), British composer

See also
Jack Hearne (disambiguation)
John Hearn (disambiguation)